Edi Christine Patterson is an American actress and writer. She has primarily acted in comedies. She is best known for portraying Fran in the film Knives Out (2019), Veronica in the series Partners (2014), Jen Abbott in the series Vice Principals (2016–2017), and Judy Gemstone in The Righteous Gemstones (2019–present).

Early life
Edi Patterson was born in Texas City, Texas. Her mother, Jeanne Patterson, was a teacher and her father, Dennis Patterson, was a plumber. She graduated from high school in 1993  and attended Southwest Texas State University, obtaining a theater Bachelor of Arts in 1997.

Career
After graduating from college, Patterson became an improv performer for both Theatresports in Austin, Texas and with The Groundlings

Highlights of her screen career to date, have been regular roles in several TV series, including eleven episodes of The Underground in 2006, ten episodes playing Veronica in Partners alongside Kelsey Grammer in 2014, starred as Jen Abbott for 15 episodes of Vice Principals (2016–2017), had a long-standing voice only role in We Bare Bears between 2015–2018, played the recurring role of Elizabeth for 6 episodes of The Last O.G. in 2018.

In 2019, Patterson starred as Judy Gemstone alongside John Goodman in the HBO TV series The Righteous Gemstones about a famous but dysfunctional family of televangelists. The same year, Patterson appeared in the mystery film Knives Out, in a cast which included Daniel Craig, Toni Collette, Michael Shannon, Don Johnson, Christopher Plummer and Jamie Lee Curtis. The film had its world premiere at the 2019 Toronto International Film Festival and received three nominations at the 77th Golden Globe Awards.

Filmography

Film

Television

Video
Anime roles

Music videos

References

External links

Groundlings.com - Edi Patterson
Improtheatre.com - Edi Patterson

Instagram

Living people
20th-century American actresses
21st-century American actresses
American film actresses
American television actresses
American voice actresses
People from Texas City, Texas
Texas State University alumni
Year of birth missing (living people)